Abu Yaaza Yalnour ibn Maymun ibn Abdallah Dukkali Hazmiri al-Gharbi (d. 572/1177) (also Bouazza) was a Dukkala Berber Sufi saint. He was the teacher of Abu Madyan. Abu al-Abbas al-Azafi wrote his biography: Di'amat al-yaqin fi za'amat al-muttaqin (The Pillar of certainty in the leadership of the God-conscious). His grave and mosque was renovated in 1691 by sultan Moulay Ismael. A yearly moussem is celebrated in his honour.

He mausoleum is located in the eponymous town of Moulay Bouazza.

Footnotes

Moroccan Sufis
12th-century Moroccan people

12th-century Berber people